Antananambo or Antanambao is a commune in northern Madagascar. It belongs to the district of Antalaha, which is a part of Sava Region. According to 2001 census the population of Antananambo was 18,232.

Only primary schooling is available in town. The majority 99% of the population are farmers.  The most important crops are rice and vanilla, while other important agricultural products are sugarcane, cloves and cassava.  Services provide employment for 1% of the population.

References and notes 

Populated places in Sava Region